Haji Imran Zafar is a Pakistani politician who was a Member of the Provincial Assembly of the Punjab, from 2010 to May 2018.

Early life and education
He was born on 10 November 1973 in Gujrat District.

He has received Intermediate-level education.

Political career
He was elected to the Provincial Assembly of the Punjab as a candidate of Pakistan Muslim League (N) (PML-N) from Constituency PP-111 (Gujrat-IV) in by-polls held in March 2010 and defeated Mian Imran Masood of PML-Q.

He was re-elected to the Provincial Assembly of the Punjab as a candidate of PML-N from Constituency PP-111 (Gujrat-IV) in 2013 Pakistani general election. He received 35,515 votes and defeated Saleem Sarwar Jaura, a candidate of Pakistan Tehreek-e-Insaf (PTI). in 2018 Pakistani general election he was defeated by PTI & PMLQ Joint candidate Chaudhry Saleem Jaura.

References

Living people
Punjab MPAs 2013–2018
1973 births
Pakistan Muslim League (N) politicians
Punjab MPAs 2008–2013